The 2019–20 Honduran Liga Nacional de Ascenso is the 53rd season of the Second level in Honduran football and the 18th under the name Liga Nacional de Ascenso.  The tournament is divided into two halves (Apertura and Clausura), each crowning one champion.

Apertura
The Apertura tournament runs from August to December 2019.  Santos F.C. qualified to a final series for their second tournament in a row. They faced C.A. Pinares, who won their first title.

Regular season

Group A

Group B

Group C

Group D

Postseason

Round of 16

Quarterfinals

Semifinals

Final

Clausura
The Clausura tournament runs from January to May 2020.

Cuartos de final 
Real Juventud 1-1 Olancho 
Olancho       3-2 Real Juventud  
Delicias F.C. 2-2 Boca Junior 
Boca Junior   1-1 Delicias F.C.
Santos F.C.   0-1 San Juan 
San Juan      2-3 Santos F.C.
Atletico Pinares 1-1 Paris F.C.
Paris F.C.       1(4)-1(3) Atletico Pinares 

Semifinales 
Olancho       1-0 Delicias F.C.
Delicias F.C. 2-1 Olancho 
Santos   F.C.  0-0 Paris F.C.
Paris F.C.     1-1 SantosF.C.

Final 
Delicias    2-2 Santos F.C.
Santos F.C. 1-3 Delicias

Promotion
The winners of both Apertura and Clausura will face to decide the team promoted to 2020–21 Honduran Liga Nacional.     

21 de June 2020        Delicias              1-1 (4-5)   Real Sociedad

References

Ascenso
2019